CampusTv is a Honduran high definition channel and the first channel to do in this country. It was founded by the Universidad de San Pedro Sula under Ricardo Jaar's presidency in 2007. The satellite signal covers the Americas and Europe.  The Parameters are described next:
 Satellite: NSS 806 (40.5°W)
 Frequency of Download: 1480 MHz 
 Polarization: Circular R/L Symbol 
 Rate:2.59 Mbit/s 
 FEC:5/6

External links
 Official site.

Television in Honduras
Mass media in San Pedro Sula